John O. Schwenn, Ph.D, (born August 19, 1949) is a former American education administrator, most recently serving as the Dalton State College's fourth president. Before his presidency at Dalton State, Schwenn served various roles at Emporia State University and Delta State University

Biography

Education
In 1971, Schwenn graduated as a psychology major from University of Wisconsin–La Crosse. From 1973 to 1976, Schwann attended the University of Wisconsin–Madison, graduating from the graduate school and with a doctoral degree.

Early career and Emporia State University
In 1976, Schwann began his nearly forty-year career in higher education as the Delta State University Director of Special Education. Thirteen years later in 1989, Schwenn moved to Emporia, Kansas to become Emporia State University's (ESU) associate chair of the Psychology department. Schwenn held various positions including the Chair of Psychology Department, and the academic affairs associate vice president. In 1997 when the university received a new president, Schwenn began his ten-year career as the academic affairs vice president and provost. In July 2006, Schwenn began his career as the Emporia State interim president, serving until October 31, 2006.

Dalton State College president
In November 2007, Schwann was selected as Dalton State College's fourth president of, beginning in March 2008. While Schwenn was president of Dalton State, undergraduate programs were increased from six to 17, increased graduation rates, expanded the college with a satellite campus in Gilmer County, Georgia and established the first residence hall on Dalton State's campus in 2010. Schwenn retired in December 2014.

References

People from La Crosse, Wisconsin
Provosts of Emporia State University
Presidents of Emporia State University
Emporia State University faculty
University of Wisconsin–Madison alumni
University of Wisconsin–La Crosse alumni
1949 births
Living people